State Highway 167 (SH 167) is a  state highway near Fowler, Colorado. SH 167 begins at the intersection of County Road 2 and County Road JJ south of Fowler and ends at SH 96 north of Fowler.

Route description
The highway goes north until it reaches CR LL west of Fowler. The highway then turns east until it passes by Fowler Jr/Sr High School and enters town as Grant Avenue. SH 167 then heads northeast through downtown and intersects U.S. Highway 50, then crosses the Arkansas River after it goes north of town. SH 167 then terminates at SH 96.

Major intersections

References

External links

167
Transportation in Crowley County, Colorado
Transportation in Otero County, Colorado